Joe Charles (born July 18, 1958) is an American mixed martial artist. He competed in the Heavyweight division. He is best known for his time in the UFC from 1994 to 2000.

Career
Charles was an accomplished high school Wrestler and Judoka, working towards the 1984 Olympics when a forklift accident halted his amateur career. He has had notable fights against Dan Severn, Murilo Bustamante, Oleg Taktarov, and Vitor Belfort. After his fighting career he developed a fitness program called GI Joe Boot Camp

Mixed martial arts record

|-
| Loss
| align=center| 6-13
| Kengo Watanabe
| Decision (unanimous)
| Pancrase: 2000 Anniversary Show
| 
| align=center| 1
| align=center| 10:00
| Yokohama, Kanagawa, Japan
| 
|-
| Loss
| align=center| 6-12
| Marcelo Tigre
| Submission (smother choke)
| RITC 2: Marching of the Warriors
| 
| align=center| 1
| align=center| 9:40
| Honolulu, Hawaii, United States
| 
|-
| Win
| align=center| 6-11
| Mark Smith
| Decision
| Ready to Rumble: Let's Get Ready to Rumble
| 
| align=center| 0
| align=center| N/A
| Woodland Hills, California, United States
| 
|-
| Loss
| align=center| 5-11
| Stefanos Miltsakakis
| Submission (keylock)
| WVC 9: World Vale Tudo Championship 9
| 
| align=center| 1
| align=center| 8:38
| Aruba
| 
|-
| Loss
| align=center| 5-10
| Mikhail Avetisyan
| TKO (submission to punches)
| IAFC: Pankration World Championship 1999
| 
| align=center| 1
| align=center| 11:21
| Moscow, Russia
| 
|-
| Loss
| align=center| 5-9
| Vitor Belfort
| Submission (armbar)
| UFC 15.5: Ultimate Japan 1
| 
| align=center| 1
| align=center| 4:03
| Yokohama, Japan
| 
|-
| Loss
| align=center| 5-8
| Nick Nutter
| TKO (submission to punches)
| IAFC: 1st Absolute Fighting World Cup Pankration
| 
| align=center| 1
| align=center| 4:34
| Tel Aviv, Israel
| 
|-
| Win
| align=center| 5-7
| Yuri Mildzikhov
| Submission (heel hook)
| IAFC: 1st Absolute Fighting World Cup Pankration
| 
| align=center| 1
| align=center| 11:02
| Tel Aviv, Israel
| 
|-
| Win
| align=center| 4-7
| Andrey Surikov
| TKO (submission to punches)
| IAFC: Absolute Fighting Championship 2 [Day 2]
| 
| align=center| 1
| align=center| 2:14
| Moscow, Russia
| 
|-
| Loss
| align=center| 3-7
| Karimula Barkalaev
| Submission (forearm choke)
| IAFC: Absolute Fighting Championship 2 [Day 1]
| 
| align=center| 1
| align=center| 9:19
| Moscow, Russia
| 
|-
| Loss
| align=center| 3-6
| Dan Bobish
| Submission (arm-triangle choke)
| WFF: World Fighting Federation
| 
| align=center| 1
| align=center| 4:42
| Birmingham, Alabama, United States
| 
|-
| Loss
| align=center| 3-5
| Pete Williams
| Submission (kneebar)
| SB 2: SuperBrawl 2
| 
| align=center| 1
| align=center| 1:39
| Honolulu, Hawaii, United States
| 
|-
| Win
| align=center| 3-4
| Wes Gassaway
| TKO (submission to strikes)
| SB 2: SuperBrawl 2
| 
| align=center| 1
| align=center| 3:26
| Honolulu, Hawaii, United States
| 
|-
| Loss
| align=center| 2-4
| Oleg Taktarov
| Submission (kneebar)
| WVC 1: World Vale Tudo Championship 1
| 
| align=center| 1
| align=center| 4:42
| Japan
| 
|-
| Loss
| align=center| 2-3
| Murilo Bustamante
| Submission (arm-triangle choke)
| UVF: Universal Vale Tudo Fighting 2
| 
| align=center| 1
| align=center| 3:08
| Brazil
| 
|-
| Win
| align=center| 2-2
| Scott Bessac
| Submission (armlock)
| UFC: Ultimate Ultimate 1995
| 
| align=center| 1
| align=center| 4:38
| Denver, Colorado, United States
| 
|-
| Loss
| align=center| 1-2
| Carl Franks
| TKO (submission to punches)
| UFCF: United Full Contact Federation 2
| 
| align=center| 1
| align=center| 26:42
| 
| 
|-
| Loss
| align=center| 1-1
| Dan Severn
| Submission (rear-naked choke)
| UFC 5: The Return of the Beast
| 
| align=center| 1
| align=center| 1:38
| Charlotte, North Carolina, United States
| 
|-
| Win
| align=center| 1-0
| Kevin Rosier
| Submission (armbar)
| UFC 4: Revenge of the Warriors
| 
| align=center| 1
| align=center| 0:14
| Tulsa, Oklahoma, United States
|

See also
List of male mixed martial artists

References

External links
 
 

1958 births
American male mixed martial artists
Heavyweight mixed martial artists
Mixed martial artists utilizing wrestling
Mixed martial artists utilizing judo
Living people
Ultimate Fighting Championship male fighters
American male judoka